Box Office India is an Indian film website. Its traffic ranking in India is 83,665 . A new Box Office India website went live on 20 January 2014.

About
Box Office India was launched on 10 June 2003.  Its uses Whois privacy to anonymize its owner. Other than India, it is frequently visited in Pakistan, Bangladesh, Nepal, and other countries where Bollywood, the Indian Hindi-language films are popular.  It receives average 83,854-page views per day and earns around $7,547 monthly from ad revenues. Box Office India's estimated net worth is around $183,641 . It has website backlinks from around 350 websites. It has been used by some leading newspapers as reference.

Box Office reports

Box office India provides information of box office results for domestic and overseas collections of Hindi films. This website updates box office reports on regular basis with territorial breakdown of domestic figures and top earners by decade and all time records. It also creates an overall week chart for domestic collections and update final worldwide gross of Hindi films. It updates opening and final figures of overseas collection of Hindi films from various countries as well as the collection of Hollywood films in India.

The site does not include collections from dubbed  Telugu, Tamil or Kannada versions of Bollywood films. The site also does not include overseas collections from Far Eastern or Russian markets.

See also
List of highest-grossing Indian films

References

External links

Film box office
Online film databases
Indian film websites
Internet properties established in 2003